The Rice Belt of the United States includes Arkansas, Louisiana, Mississippi and Texas, four southern U.S. states that grow a significant portion of the nation's rice crop.  The name is in conformity with the Corn Belt of the Midwestern United States, in which much of the nation's corn is grown.

Arkansas is the nation's leading rice producer, followed by California (not part of the Rice Belt), Louisiana, Mississippi, Texas, and Missouri (bordering on, but not part of, the Rice Belt).

See also 
 Banana Belt
 Rice production in the United States
 Rice production in Arkansas
 Texas rice production

References

Regions of the Southern United States
Belt
Belt regions of the United States
Economy of the Southern United States
Agricultural belts